Dipalmitoylphosphatidylethanolamine is a phosphatidylethanolamine.  Like other phospholipids, it has been used as part of model bilayer membranes.

References

Phosphatidylethanolamines